Adam Beard (born 7 January 1996) is a Welsh rugby union player currently playing for United Rugby Championship side Ospreys as a Lock. A Wales international, Beard has also been selected to tour with the British and Irish Lions.

Club career

Beard made his debut for the Ospreys in 2012 having previously played for their academy team, Aberavon RFC and Birchgrove RFC.

International

Wales
In May 2017 Beard was named in the Wales senior squad for the tests against Tonga and Samoa in June 2017 He made his debut for Wales against Samoa in Apia on the 2017 summer tour, coming on as a replacement, and then made his first start in the home victory over Georgia five months later. His 6 Nations debut came in the win over France in Paris in 2019 – his ninth straight win in a Wales shirt. He went on to start in four of the Grand Slam matches in the 2019 championships, and come on as a replacement in the other, as he extended his unbeaten run in a Welsh shirt to 11 matches up to 1 August, 2019.

British and Irish Lions
Beard was called into the British & Irish Lions squad for the 2021 tour to South Africa. This followed the temporary withdrawal of tour captain Alun Wyn Jones following a shoulder injury. On July 7th, Beard made his Lions debut in the Provincial game against the Sharks. Beard would go on to make his Lions test debut in the third test against the Springboks.

Personal life
Beard is in a relationship with Chelsea Lewis, the Wales netball international.

References

External links

Ospreys Player Profile
WRU Player Profile

Rugby union players from Swansea
Welsh rugby union players
Wales international rugby union players
Ospreys (rugby union) players
Living people
1996 births
British & Irish Lions rugby union players from Wales
Rugby union locks